Bandhan  is a 1940 Indian Bollywood film directed by N.R. Acharya and starring Leela Chitnis, Ashok Kumar and Suresh. It was the second highest grossing Indian film of 1940. It was produced by Bombay Talkies.

Cast
 Leela Chitnis as Beena
 Ashok Kumar as Nirmal
 Suresh 		
 P.F. Pithawala 		
 V.H. Desai as Bholanath
 Shah Nawaz as Suresh
 Purnima Desai as Gauri
 Jagannath 	
 Arun Kumar

References

External links
 

1940 films
1940s Hindi-language films
Indian drama films
1940 drama films
Indian black-and-white films
Hindi-language drama films
Films scored by Saraswati Devi